HLA class II histocompatibility antigen, DM alpha chain is a protein that in humans is encoded by the HLA-DMA gene.

HLA-DMA belongs to the HLA class II alpha chain paralogues. This class II molecule is a heterodimer consisting of an alpha (DMA) and a beta chain (DMB), both anchored in the membrane. It is located in intracellular vesicles. DM plays a central role in the peptide loading of MHC class II molecules by helping to release the CLIP molecule from the peptide binding site. Class II molecules are expressed in antigen presenting cells (APC: B lymphocytes, dendritic cells, macrophages). The alpha chain is approximately 33-35 kDa and its gene contains 5 exons. Exon one encodes the leader peptide, exons 2 and 3 encode the two extracellular domains, exon 4 encodes the transmembrane domain and the cytoplasmic tail.

References

Further reading

MHC class II